Jordi Trias Feliu (born November 5, 1980) is a Spanish former basketball player.

Professional career
After spending his early years at his hometown's local team, Girona, Trias was finally transferred to FC Barcelona at the beginning of the 2004–05 season. He was named the 2007 Spanish King's Cup MVP. After spending five seasons by FC Barcelona he signed a four-year contract with DKV Joventut in August 2010.

Sportive evolution
 CE Maristes Girona: Youth Clubs
 CB Sant Josep Girona: Youth Clubs
 Club Bàsquet Girona: Youth Clubs
 ADEPAF Figueres: 1998-01
 Etosa Murcia: 2001-02
 Casademont Girona: 2002-04
 FC Barcelona: 2004
 Casademont Girona: 2005
 FC Barcelona: 2005-2010
 DKV Joventut: 2010-2013

Spain national team

Trias won the bronze medal at the 2005 Mediterranean Games, while playing for the Spain national basketball team.

Awards and accomplishments
Euroleague (1): 2010
Spanish Championships (1): 2009
Spanish Cups (2): 2007, 2010
Spanish Cup MVP: 2007
Spanish Supercups (2): 2004, 2009
Spanish Copa Príncipe (1): 2014
Spanish Copa Príncipe MVP (1): 2014
Spanish Second Division (1): 2014
Spanish Second Division MVP (3): 2014, 2017, 2018
Spanish Third Division MVP (1): 2019
Catalan Tournaments (2): 2004–05, 2009–10

References

External links
Euroleague.net Profile
Eurobasket.com Profile
Draftexpress.com Profile
FIBA Game Center Profile
Spanish League Profile 

1980 births
Living people
Basketball players from Catalonia
Bàsquet Girona players
BC Andorra players
Competitors at the 2005 Mediterranean Games
FC Barcelona Bàsquet players
Joventut Badalona players
Liga ACB players
Mediterranean Games bronze medalists for Spain
Mediterranean Games medalists in basketball
Power forwards (basketball)
Spanish expatriate basketball people in Andorra
Spanish men's basketball players